The Notre Dame Collegiate Jazz Festival is the oldest jazz festival in the U.S. It takes place every spring at the University of Notre Dame in South Bend, Indiana. The university invites college bands and professional jazz musicians from throughout the country to participate in the weekend event.

In 2016, a female panel of judges was chosen for the first time since the festival began in 1959. The judges were Marion Hayden, Allison Miller, Helen Sung, and sisters Christine Jensen and Ingrid Jensen. The panel was chosen by Larry Dwyer, director of jazz studies at Notre Dame. Dwyer is a graduate of Notre Dame, a composer, band leader, and former high school band teacher who was named best trombonist twice when he participated in the festival earlier in his career.

Past judges

 Bill Evans
 Bob James
 Branford Marsalis
 Cannonball Adderley
 Charlie Haden
 Clark Terry
 Claudio Roditi
 Conte Candoli
 Danny Gottlieb
 Dave Holland
 Dee Dee Bridgewater
 Ed Shaughnessy
 Ellis Marsalis
 Frank Wess
 Gene Bertoncini
 Gerald Wilson
 Herb Ellis
 Herbie Hancock
 Hubert Laws
 Jack DeJohnette
 Jeff Clayton
 Jim McNeely
 Jimmy Heath
 Jimmy Owens
 Joanne Brackeen
 Joe Farrell
 John Clayton, Jr.
 John Lewis
 Jon Faddis
 Lalo Schifrin
 Lew Tabackin
 Louie Bellson
 Malachi Favors
 Marc Johnson
 Marion Hayden
 Paquito D'Rivera
 Pat Martino
 Peter Erskine
 Quincy Jones
 Randy Brecker
 Ray Brown
 Red Rodney
 Richard Davis
 Rodney Whitaker
 Ron Carter
 Roy Hargrove
 Roy Haynes
 Sonny Rollins
 Stan Kenton
 Terell Stafford
 Terence Blanchard
 Terri Lynne Carrington
 Tony Williams
 Wallace Roney
 Wayne Shorter
 Wycliffe Gordon
 Wynton Marsalis
 Zoot Sims

References

External links
 Notre Dame Collegiate Jazz Festival Official Website
 1960 Festival flyer

Jazz festivals in the United States
University of Notre Dame